Threshold Editions is an imprint of publishers Simon & Schuster, a division of ViacomCBS, specializing in conservative non-fiction. The publisher is Louise Burke; Mary Matalin was its founding editor-in-chief.

Threshold Editions was founded to "provide a forum for the creative people, bedrock principles, and innovative ideas of contemporary conservatism". The imprint was launched after Penguin Books launched Sentinel and Random House launched Crown Forum. Within four years of launching and due to Matalin's network, the imprint had already counted Glenn Beck, Vice President Dick Cheney, and Karl Rove among its authors and was producing bestselling books.

The publisher of Threshold Editions, Louise Burke, stated in an interview that Threshold "best understands the conservative book-buying audience--a key factor needed to keep the hits coming." Matalin and Burke were introduced in 2005 and Burke said, "We were kindred spirits and we took it from there." Of the launch Burke said, "This is an area where it really helps to be a believer. I don't feel you can be successful in this particular genre if you are opposed to the message."

Glenn Beck's book, An Inconvenient Book, reached No.1 on the New York Times Bestseller in 2007.

Karl Rove sold his memoirs, Courage and Consequence: My Life as a Conservative in the Fight, to Threshold in 2007 after an auction with nine bidders, including another one of Simon & Schuster's imprints, Free Press. Rove, who received a seven-figure deal, stated that he chose the imprint as he was a longtime friend of Mary Matalin.

While sales of hardcovers were down for Simon & Schuster in 2009 and early 2010, Threshold Editions had the biggest hits for the company.

By 2014, Threshold was not only publishing memoirs and political commentary, but also young adult and fiction novels such as Rush Limbaugh's Rush Revere and the Brave Pilgrims.

In 2015, Threshold signed a book deal with Donald Trump, for a book originally titled Crippled America: How to Make America Great Again. The title was later changed to Great Again: How to Fix Crippled America. The book debuted at #5 on Publishers Weekly Frontlist Hardcover Nonfiction list.

The Hollywood Reporter broke the news and social media quickly responded. Within 24 hours of the book being announced it had reached number one on the Amazon best-seller list.

Publication of the book by Simon & Schuster was eventually canceled in February 2017 after a video clip of Yiannopoulos appearing to defend pedophilia resurfaced. He defended himself asserting that he had used regrettably "imprecise language" and was not an advocate for pedophilia. Yiannopoulos attempted to sue the publishers for breach of contract, but later dropped his lawsuit.

Authors
The imprint's authors include:

 Broadcasters

 Glenn Beck
 Lou Dobbs
 Mike Gallagher
 Laura Ingraham
 Mark R. Levin
 Rush Limbaugh
 John Stossel

 Political leaders

 Jeb Bush
 John Bolton
 Herman Cain
 Dick Cheney
 Bobby Jindal
 Karl Rove
 Donald Trump

 Political commentators

 Dinesh D'Souza
 Tom Fitton
 Pete Hegseth
 David Limbaugh
 Michelle Malkin
 Jason Mattera
 Oliver North
 James O'Keefe
 Katie Pavlich
 Ben Shapiro
 Michael Knowles

See also
 Broadside Books, the conservative non-fiction imprint of HarperCollins
 Crown Forum, the conservative non-fiction imprint of Crown Publishing Group, a subsidiary of Random House
 Sentinel, the conservative non-fiction imprint of Penguin Group

References

External links

Book publishing company imprints
Book publishing companies of the United States
Simon & Schuster
Publishing companies established in 2005
Conservative media in the United States